Karin Lundgren (4 January 1895 – 16 September 1977) was a Swedish freestyle swimmer. She competed at the 1912 Summer Olympics in the 100 m event, but was eliminated in the first round.

She changed her last name after marrying Mr. Heijkenskjöld, but divorced in 1947.

References

1895 births
1977 deaths
Olympic swimmers of Sweden
Swimmers at the 1912 Summer Olympics
Swedish female freestyle swimmers
Swimmers from Gothenburg